William Ernesto Izarra Caldera (7 May 1947 – 1 October 2021) was a Venezuelan diplomat, military official, and politician. He also worked as a professor for the Central University of Venezuela.

Biography
Following his military service, Izarra earned a master's degree in public policy planning from Harvard University and was awarded an honorary doctorate from Universidad Nacional Experimental Simón Rodríguez in 2010. He was a member of the Revolutionary Bolivarian Movement-200, the Fifth Republic Movement and the United Socialist Party of Venezuela. He also organized the Alianza Revolucionaria de Oficiales Activos. In 1989, he joined the Frente Patriótico Revolucionario. He continued his revolutionary work for socialism throughout his life.

Izarra served in the Senate of Venezuela from 1998 to 1999 and was appointed by Hugo Chávez to serve in the newly-created position Deputy Minister of Foreign Affairs for Asia, the Middle East and Oceania in 2005. In 2021, he served as Venezuela's ambassador to North Korea.

William Izarra died from COVID-19 in Caracas on 1 October 2021, at age 74, during the COVID-19 pandemic in Venezuela.

Publications
En Busca de la Revolución
El tiempo que nos queda
Momentos de la Revolución
Folletos del Proceso
Cuentos de Fácil Lectura
Los Toques del Clarín

References

1947 births
2021 deaths
Academic staff of the Central University of Venezuela
Harvard Kennedy School alumni
Members of the Senate of Venezuela
Ambassadors of Venezuela to North Korea
20th-century Venezuelan politicians
21st-century Venezuelan politicians
Deaths from the COVID-19 pandemic in Venezuela
People from Maracay
Death in Caracas